Route 137 is a highway in southern Missouri.  Its northern terminus is at Route 32 in Licking; its southern terminus is at U.S. Route 60/U.S. Route 63/Route 76 in Willow Springs.

History
The road that is Route 137 first appeared on state maps in 1933 as Route J. However, in that year it was only a short spur from U.S 60 & 63, only going as far as the Texas/Howell County line. Route J was extended to Route 17 in Yukon the following year. Route J was upgraded to Route 137 in 1937. In 1964, Route 137 was extended to Licking, taking over a section of U.S Route 63 (U.S 63 was subsequently routed on to a new road to the west). The former section of U.S 63 between Houston and Raymondville still remains part of the state system as Route B (Route T from 1964–75).

Major intersections

References

137
Transportation in Howell County, Missouri
Transportation in Texas County, Missouri